Enescu is a Romanian surname. Notable people with the surname include:

Adrian Enescu (1948–2016), Romanian composer
Andrei Enescu (born 1987), Romanian footballer
George Enescu (1881–1955), Romanian classical violinist, pianist and composer
Nicolae Enescu (1911–1993), Romanian politician

See also
Enescu Prize, Romanian prize in music composition founded by the Romanian composer George Enescu, awarded from 1913 to 1946, and afterwards by the National University of Music Bucharest.

Romanian-language surnames